Tim Niemier is a designer of watercraft, currently focusing on kayaks and stand up paddleboards. Niemier is credited with introducing the sit-on-top (SOT) kayak design. “I sort of introduced those,” Niemier said of the sit-on-top design. “I didn't really invent it.”

In January 1988, Tim founded kayak manufacturing and sales company, Ocean Kayak, to produce these unique kayaks using polyethylene. Ocean Kayak was producing upwards of 200 kayaks per day when its assets were purchased in 1997 by Johnson Worldwide Associates, now Johnson Outdoors, Inc.

Since selling Ocean Kayak, Niemier has been providing custom design services and creating new lines of stand up paddleboards and other watercraft for manufacturers and individuals.

Early life 
Niemier grew up in Malibu, California and loved being out on the water in spite of his fear of it. His expertise with watercraft started early, spending much of his spare time as a youth paddling along the coast and out to dive sites. He learned about their design dynamics and began testing designs of his own.

In 1971, Niemier designed and produced his first kayak using fiberglass molding. While taking it to the beach to test he was asked how much it cost. Not expecting anyone to buy it, Niemier offered to sell it at three times his production cost. The price was accepted and, fresh out of high school, Niemier had sold his first kayak.

In the years following, Niemier set up shop in Malibu selling personally-designed kayaks to customers on a small stretch of beach near home. From this success, he realized the potential for much bigger sales volumes in larger markets.

Ocean Kayak 
After years of successful design and sales, Niemier launched Ocean Kayak in Ferndale, Washington in 1988. Adopting rotational molding as the preferred production process, enabled producing kayaks in far greater quantities than possible with fiberglass molds. This supported the success they were having in the marketplace.

In 1997, Johnson Worldwide Associates, Inc. (now Johnson Outdoors, Inc.), purchased the assets of Ocean Kayak. The terms of the purchase were not made public.

Origami Paddler 
Tim first designed and launched a foldable standup paddle board in 2012 called the Origami Paddler at the website Origamipaddler.com. This first version relied on a combination of a hinge and strap to fold and secure the board.  Tim redesigned and relaunched the Origami Paddler using the same site domain in summer of 2020 on Kickstarter, which rapidly grew to become one of the top Kickstarter campaigns of all time, despite the global COVID-19 pandemic, with over 8,000 backers pledging over 3.8 million dollars.  The new design can be used as a standup paddle board or kayak with three hollow plastic hulls connected by a unique modular hinge and locking system that allows the Origami Paddler to fold open and closed or be secured in "paddle mode".  The Origami Paddler is suggested for use in flat, calm water with a capacity of 250 lbs.  Its total weight is composed of three 15 pound hulls. Its dimensions allow it to be ground-shipped in the US and to fit in the trunk space of most compact cars.  Tim has stated his goal to be environmentally responsible with plastic manufacturing, sources, and waste streams.

The company was placed into receivership in July 2022 after failing to fulfil orders and having issues with manufacturing (e.g. broken hinges, hull leakages through mold holes and seams) as well as shipping (e.g. shipping out of order, inadequate packaging).

The company entered into receivership on July 15, and is now controlled by a court-appointed receiver. The receiver is entertaining offers from third parties who have expressed an interest in acquiring the assets and rebooting the product lines in some manner. That process will likely take 60 to 90 days, depending on offers received and any time the acquiring company wants to spend on due diligence before the final transfer of ownership takes place.

Details of the court-appointed receiver:

Resource Transition Consultants, LLC
ATTN: Kevin Hanchett
4100 194th Street SW
Suite 208
Lynwood WA 98036

Currently 
Niemier now lives in Bellingham, Washington where he continues creating new kayak and stand up paddleboard designs, provide business consulting services and speaking. Niemier's personal goal remains the same, “To put a billion butts in boats.”

References

External links 
 On Water Designs

Living people
1951 births
Boat and ship designers